The 2018 World Sambo Championships was held in Bucharest, Romania from 9 and 12 November 2018. 

This tournament, marking the 80th of its kind, included 9 weight categories and three disciplines; men's and women's sambo and combat sambo. Around 750 athletes from 80 countries participated. Macau and Saint Lucia participated for the first time. A total prize of $216,000 was awarded.

Medal table

Medal overview

Sambo events

Men

Women

Combat Sambo events

References

External links 
Competition news

World Sambo Championships
World Sambo Championships, 2018
2018 in sambo (martial art)
Sports competitions in Bucharest
International sports competitions hosted by Romania
World Sambo Championships